Frédéric Bessy (born 9 January 1972 in Villefranche-sur-Saône) is a French former professional road bicycle racer, last riding for UCI ProTeam Cofidis.

Major results

 Prix des Blés d'Or (1998)
 1st Stage 5 TTT 2001 Tour de France
 GP Lugano (2004)

External links 
Profile at Cofidis official website 
Supporters website 

1972 births
Living people
Sportspeople from Villefranche-sur-Saône
French male cyclists
Cyclists from Auvergne-Rhône-Alpes